Eupithecia kibatiata is a moth in the  family Geometridae. It is found in the Democratic Republic of Congo, Kenya, Tanzania and Uganda.

References

Moths described in 1938
kibatiata
Moths of Africa